The  is the only active artillery brigade of the Japan Ground Self-Defense Force. The brigade is subordinated to the Northern Army and is headquartered in Chitose, Hokkaidō. Its responsibility is the defense of Hokkaidō.

Organization 
 1st Artillery Brigade, in Chitose
 1st Artillery Brigade HQ, in Chitose
 1st Artillery Regiment (Mechanized), in Chitose
 101st Artillery Battalion, in Bihoro, with three batteries of M110 203mm Howitzers
 102nd Artillery Battalion, with three batteries of M110 203mm Howitzers
 129th Artillery Battalion, with three batteries of M270 Multiple Rocket Launchers
 4th Artillery Regiment (Mechanized), in Kamifurano
 104th Artillery Battalion, with three batteries of M110 203mm Howitzers
 132nd Artillery Battalion, with three batteries of M270 Multiple Rocket Launchers
 1st Surface-to-Surface Missile Regiment, in Chitose, with four batteries of Type 88 Surface-to-Ship Missiles
 2nd Surface-to-Surface Missile Regiment, in Bibai, with four batteries of Type 88 Surface-to-Ship Missiles
 3rd Surface-to-Surface Missile Regiment, in Kamifurano, with four batteries of Type 88 Surface-to-Ship Missiles
 301st Observation Battery, in Chitose

External links
 Homepage 1st Artillery Brigade (Japanese)

Japan Ground Self-Defense Force Brigade
Military units and formations established in 1952